Ascoltami may refer to:

Ascoltami, a film directed by Carlo Campogalliani 
"Ascoltami", a 1965 song by Louiselle, also covered by Dalida, written Carlo Rossi and Vittorio Bezzi